Orca: The Killer Whale of the Hood is the 12th studio album (13th overall) by American rapper C-Bo, which was released on July 3, 2012 through his own imprint West Coast Mafia Records and Uneek-Music. The album features guest performances by Young Buck, WC, Yukmouth, B.G. Knocc Out, Brotha Lynch Hung E-40, Paul Wall, Slick Pulla ( CTE) and more.

Background
"187" was the first track released off the album along with the music video featuring westcoast rapper WC on May 21, 2012.

The track "Fuckin Wit It" feat. E-40 was released June 7, 2012 from the album free of charge to promote the upcoming release of the album.

On June 14 C-Bo announced via his Official Twitter account that the album release date was set for July 3 nationwide.

Track listing

References

2012 albums
C-Bo albums
Albums produced by Cardo